Atlides is a genus of gossamer-winged butterflies (family Lycaenidae). Among these, it belongs belong to the tribe Eumaeini of the subfamily Theclinae. These small butterflies are widespread in the Americas, occurring almost anywhere between the southern United States and Argentina.

Species
17 named and 5 (or more) undescribed species are known or assumed to belong to this genus:
 Atlides atys (Cramer, [1779])
 Atlides bacis (Godman & Salvin, [1887])
 Atlides browni Constantino, Salazar & Johnson, 1993
 Atlides carpasia (Hewitson, 1868)
 Atlides cosa (Hewitson, 1867)
 Atlides dahnersi Bálint, Constantino & Johnson, 2003
 Atlides gaumeri (Godman, [1901])
 Atlides halesus – great purple hairstreak, great blue hairstreak
 Atlides halljasoni Bálint & Wojtusiak, 2006
 Atlides havila (Hewitson, 1865)
 Atlides inachus (Cramer, [1775])
 Atlides misma D'Abrera, 1995
 Atlides polama (Schaus, 1902)
 Atlides polybe (Linnaeus, 1763)
 Atlides rustan (Stoll, [1790])
 Atlides thargelia (Burmeister, 1878)
 Atlides zava (Hewitson, 1878)
 Atlides sp. 'Bahia'
 Atlides sp. 'Colombia'
 Atlides sp. 'Costa Rica'
 Atlides sp. 'Ecuador'
 Atlides sp. 'Peru'

A. thargelia was recently proposed for separation as monotypic genus "Riojana", but it was subsequently argued to be a nomen nudum per Article 13.1 of the ICZN Code, because an appropriate genus description was not given. The matter has been submitted to the ICZN for discussion. Regardless the questions of nomenclature, A. thargelia is for the time being retained here; given that several undescribed relatives are known to exist, splitting off monotypic lineages now runs risk of leaving the remaining group paraphyletic.

Footnotes

References
  (2011): Markku Savela's Lepidoptera and Some Other Life Forms – Atlides. Version of December 22, 2011. Retrieved April 1, 2012.

External links

Atlides images at EOL

Eumaeini
Lycaenidae of South America
Lycaenidae genera
Taxa named by Jacob Hübner